Bell and Hammer or Whitehorse is a dice game, which was quite popular in Europe in the 19th and early 20th centuries.

It is often assumed that the inventor was the Viennese art dealer Heinrich Friedrich Müller (1779-1848), but although Müller contributed greatly to the spread of the game, there is no evidence that he was the inventor. In German, the game is known as Glocke und Hammer or Schimmel.

Especially among the Jewish population, it was a very popular pastime during the Hanukkah festival, as well as the Dreidel game. After the Second World War, the game almost completely disappeared.

References

External links 
 Schimmel rules and history

Board games
Auction board games
Board games introduced in the 1800s